Cape Beaufort is a cape on the coast of Chukchi Sea in North Slope Borough, Alaska, United States.

Cape Beaufort was named in 1826 for Captain Francis Beaufort.

References

Beaufort
Landforms of North Slope Borough, Alaska